is a private university in Matsuyama, Ehime Prefecture, Japan. The predecessor of the school was founded in 1923, and it was chartered as a university in 1949. The present name was adopted in 1989.

Organization

Faculties
Economics
Business Administration
Humanities
English Department
Sociology Department
Law

Graduate courses
Economics
Business Administration
Language Communication
Sociology
Law
Clinical Pharmacy

Matsuyama University also offers a six-year program through College of Pharmaceutical Sciences. In addition, evening classes are taught through Matsuyama Junior College's Commercial Department.

References

External links

 Official website 
 English website 

Educational institutions established in 1923
Private universities and colleges in Japan
Matsuyama University
1923 establishments in Japan
Matsuyama, Ehime